This is a list of Armenian states, countries and regions throughout history. 
It includes empires, countries, states, provinces, regions and territories that have or had in the past one of the following characteristics:
An ethnic Armenian majority or significant portion of it
Armenians are an official, constitutional or titular nation
Armenian  as an official language or the native language of the majority 
An Armenian ruling class or dynasty

Prehistoric Armenia
Nairi
Hayasa-Azzi

Historical political entities

Independent 
Early 
Kingdom of Urartu (860 BC–590 BC)
Satrapy of Armenia* (570 BC–321 BC)
  Kingdom of Armenia (331 BC–428 AD)
Kingdom of Sophene (3rd century – 94 BC)
Kingdom of Commagene (163 BC – 72 AD)
Medieval

Zakarid Armenia (1201–1330s)
Principality of Khachen (11th century – 1750)

Semi-independent 

 Emirate of Armenia* (637–884)

Modern political entities

Ottoman Empire

Russian Empire 
 Armenian Oblast (1828–1840) – about half of the population
 Erivan Governorate (1850–1917) – 3/5 of the population
 Kars Oblast (1878–1918) – about 1/3 of the population, plurality
 Elizavetpol Governorate (1868–1917) – about 1/3 of the population; majority in the Shusha uezd, significant part of the population of the Kazakh and Zangezur uezds
 Tiflis Governorate (1847–1917) – more than 1/4 of the population; majority in the Akhalkalaki uezd, plurality in the Borchaly uezd, second ethnic group in the Akhaltsikhe uezd

World War I and later years 
Republic of Van (1915–1918) in the Armenian-inhabited areas of the Ottoman Empire occupied by the Russian Empire
Special Transcaucasian Committee (1917) included the Armenian inhabited regions of the Russian Empire
Transcaucasian Commissariat (1917–1918) included the Armenian inhabited regions of the Russian Empire
Transcaucasian Democratic Federative Republic (1918) included the Armenian inhabited regions of the Russian Empire
 Democratic Republic of Armenia (1918–1920) was first-ever modern Armenian state
 Republic of Mountainous Armenia (1921) was formed in Syunik, Vayots Dzor and some parts of Nagorno-Karabakh

Soviet Union 
 Armenian Soviet Socialist Republic (1920–1991)
Nagorno-Karabakh Autonomous Oblast within Azerbaijan Soviet Socialist Republic (1923–1991) – about 3/4 of the total population

Present political entities 
This is the list of the current states and regions where Armenians are in absolute or relative ethnic majority, are one of the constitutional or recognized peoples or Armenian language is official:
 Armenia
 Republic of Artsakh - unrecognized state, de jure part of Azerbaijan Republic

References

See also 
 United Armenia, irredentist claim to regions historically and currently populated by Armenians

Armenian states
States
Armenia
hy:Հայկական պետությունների և տարածքների ցանկ